This is a list of seasons completed by the Iowa Hawkeyes football program since the team's inception in 1889. The list documents season-by-season records, and conference records from 1892 to 1896 and 1900 to the present. The Hawkeyes began playing football as a club sport in 1872, and began playing intramural games against other colleges in 1882, but it was not until 1889 when Iowa challenged Iowa College to an interscholastic varsity football game. Since then, the Hawkeyes have played over 1,200 games, including 30 bowl games.

Historically, Iowa has seen moderate success. The Hawkeyes won the Western Interstate University Football Association championship in 1896 and the Big Ten Conference football  championship in 1900 – the school's first year as a member of the Big Ten Conference – but did not win another in the Big Ten until 1921. Iowa's coach at that time was Howard Jones. Under his direction, the Hawkeyes won conference championships in 1921 and 1922, and recorded a school-record 20-game winning streak from 1920 to 1923. However, the Hawkeyes' success on the field dipped once again. Debt on Iowa's new football stadium – Iowa Stadium – grew yearly, and the Hawkeyes finished in the bottom three of the Big Ten every year except 1933 from 1930 to 1938. Then, in 1939, Iowa surprisingly finished the season 6–1–1, tripling the win total from the last two seasons combined.  The team was nicknamed the "Ironmen," and is generally thought to be one of the greatest teams in school history. They were led by Heisman winner Nile Kinnick, who died in 1943 during a World War II training flight. 29 years later, in 1972, Iowa Stadium was renamed as "Kinnick Stadium" in his honor.

Following the 1939 season, the Hawkeyes slipped into another "down period."  From 1940 to 1955, Iowa recorded 11 losing seasons, and their best finish in the Big Ten was fourth. But in 1952, the Hawkeyes upset Ohio State in Forest Evashevski's first season as coach. Three years later, in 1956, the Hawkeyes won the Big Ten championship with a 9–1 record. Under Evashevski, Iowa won two more conference championships in 1958 and 1960, posting 8–1–1 and 8–1 records respectively. In 1958, the Hawkeyes were awarded the Grantland Rice Trophy as national champions of the Football Writers Association of America. Soon thereafter, however, Evashevski became athletic director, and the football program suffered. The team posted a winning record in 1961 under new head coach Jerry Burns, but it was Iowa's last winning season until 1981. From 1961 to 1978, the Hawkeyes had four head coaches. Not one of them had a team that finished better than fourth in the Big Ten.

In 1979, Hayden Fry was hired as Iowa's 24th head coach. In 1981, he took the Hawkeyes to their first Rose Bowl since 1958. Iowa won the Big Ten championship three times under Fry, and played in the Rose Bowl in each of those seasons. Following his tenure at Iowa, which ended after the 1998 season, Kirk Ferentz was hired as his successor. Ferentz has won Big Ten championships twice at Iowa, in 2002 and 2004.

Seasons

References

External links 
 HawkeyeSports.com — Official Iowa Hawkeyes football website

Lists of college football seasons
Iowa Hawkeyes football seasons